Knights Field is a baseball park located on the campus of Bellarmine University in Louisville, Kentucky. It is home of the Bellarmine Knights baseball team.

With the Knights making the jump to NCAA Division I in 2020, the university announced that they would be prioritizing upgrades to Knights Field.

See also
 List of NCAA Division I baseball venues

References

External links
 Knights Field

College baseball venues in the United States
Baseball venues in Kentucky
Buildings and structures in Louisville, Kentucky
Bellarmine Knights baseball
Sports venues in Louisville, Kentucky
1954 establishments in Kentucky
Sports venues completed in 1954